Éxitos is the greatest hits album from Tempo, released on January 29, 2002.

Track listing
 "Intro"
 "Amén" 
 "Ven y Vuela"
 "Intro"
 "La Misión" 
 "Intro"
 "Muchos Quieren" 
 "Balas"  
 "T.E.M.P.O" 
 "Narco Hampón" 
 "Dream Team Killer"
 "Las Gerlas (Remix)" 
 "No Es Tan Fácil"
 "Voy de Misión"
 "Tú y Quien Más" 
 "Descontrólate"
 "Ahora Sí Mami"

2002 compilation albums
Tempo (rapper) albums